Linda Marshall is an American actress. She started her television career in the 1963 situation comedy My Three Sons, and in 1965 appeared in her first movie, The Girls on the Beach.

Marshall was born in Wichita, Kansas, graduated from Wichita East High School, and attended Colorado State College, (now called University of Northern Colorado) in Greeley, Colorado. Her interest in acting developed at Little Theatre of the Rockies and the Oregon Shakespeare Festival.

In 1968 she attended the Palermo Conference in the Mediterranean of the Baháʼí Faith and then volunteered some time as a guide at the Baháʼí World Center. Then she traveled later in 1968 into 1969 to many locations in the US speaking about her religion. She toured in Europe for the religion in 1970 and continued to do so back in the United States in 1971, when she was also on the program of a conference on the religion in the Caribbean. In 1972 she appeared in a movie about the religion.

TV series and film 

Perry Mason (1963), Young Nun / Norma Weaver 
77 Sunset Strip (1963), Jacqueline Duncan 
My Three Sons (1963)
Hazel (1963–1964), Linda Sterling / Secretary
Mr. Novak (1963–1965), high-school student
Grindl (1964), Sue Wilson
Wendy and Me (1964) 
F Troop (1965), Lucy Landfield
The Dick Van Dyke Show (1965), Doris 
Tammy (1965–1966), Gloria Tate
Tammy and the Millionaire (Universal Pictures feature film, 1967), Gloria Tate
The Waltons (1977), Fern Lockwood

Movies
The Girls on the Beach (1965) Cynthia

References

External links

 

American television actresses
American film actresses
Living people
American Bahá'ís
21st-century American women
1941 births